Kapalong, officially the Municipality of Kapalong, is a 1st class municipality in the province of Davao del Norte, Philippines. According to the 2020 census, it has a population of 81,068 people.

History
Through Executive Order No. 151 signed by President Elpidio Quirino, the town was founded on July 8, 1948, from the Municipal District of Tagum, which was formed in 1918. It was one of the oldest towns in Davao del Norte Province, others being Tagum, in 1941; and Panabo, in 1949, both of which were converted into cities almost 50 years later. Though the towns of Santo Tomas, Talaingod and portion of San Isidro emerged from Kapalong in 1959, 1991, and 2004 respectively, it is still the largest town by land area in the province of Davao del Norte.

Geography

Climate

Barangays
Kapalong is politically subdivided into 14 barangays.

Semong
Florida
Gabuyan
Gupitan
Capungagan
Katipunan
Luna
Mabantao
Mamacao
Pag-asa
Maniki (Poblacion)
Sampao
Sua-on
Tiburcia

Demographics

Economy

References

External links
 Kapalong Profile at the DTI Cities and Municipalities Competitive Index
 [ Philippine Standard Geographic Code]
 Philippine Census Information
 Local Governance Performance Management System

Municipalities of Davao del Norte
States and territories established in 1948
Establishments by Philippine executive order